Luise Wanser (born 7 June 1997) is a German sailor. She competed in the women's 470 event at the 2020 Summer Olympics.

References

External links
 
 
 

1997 births
Living people
German female sailors (sport)
Olympic sailors of Germany
Sailors at the 2020 Summer Olympics – 470
Sportspeople from Essen